The Story of a Three-Day Pass is a 1967 film written and directed by Melvin Van Peebles, based on his French-language novel . It stars Harry Baird as a black American soldier who is demoted for fraternizing with a white shop clerk (Nicole Berger) in France.

Along with writing and directing the film, Van Peebles collaborated on its score with Mickey Baker and sings one of the two songs written for the film, "When My Number Gonna Hit". The other song, "Hard Times", is a duet; one of the singers is Mickey Baker. The film premiered in 1967 at the San Francisco International Film Festival. In 2020, the film was one of the selections of the Cannes Classics section at the Cannes Film Festival.

Plot
The film tells the story of Turner, a black U.S. Army G.I. stationed in France whose captain gives him a three-day pass just after he promotes him. As Turner gets ready to leave, his reflection in the mirror accuses him of being an Uncle Tom, but this is not the only time his reflection criticizes him or makes him doubt himself.

Turner goes to Paris, where he wanders mostly aimlessly for the first day. He finds himself in a nightclub, where he meets a white French shop clerk named Miriam. The pair spends the rest of the weekend together, enjoying their romance but also struggling with the complexities of racism. Eventually their miscegenation is reported to Turner's captain and Turner is restricted to barracks. After some visiting African-American women convince his commander to lift the restriction, he finds his girlfriend unavailable when he telephones her, and he decides that such amorous adventures are futile.

Cast
 Harry Baird as Turner
 Nicole Berger as Miriam
 Hal Brav as Turner's Captain

Production
The film was shot over a period of six weeks for a cost of $200,000.

Reception
In 2020, The New Yorker critic Richard Brody described The Story of a Three-Day Pass as being "among the great American films of the sixties."

References

External links 
 
 
  EP info from Blaxploitation.com
 The Story of a Three Day Pass: Ordinary Love an essay by Allyson Nadia Field at the Criterion Collection

1967 films
French black-and-white films
Films based on American novels
Films based on French novels
Films directed by Melvin Van Peebles
French independent films
Films about race and ethnicity
1967 romantic drama films
Films about interracial romance
English-language French films
1960s French-language films
1967 directorial debut films
1960s French films